The opening rounds of the 2007 NCAA Division I men's basketball tournament were held March 13–17, 2007.

Scores and schedule
Unless otherwise specified, all games were on CBS, except for the play-in game, which aired on ESPN and two additional games. Those games were broadcast on CSTV except in the natural areas of the teams involved, as those were broadcast on CBS. Times listed are US EDT (UTC-4).

Team names are those listed on the NCAA's scoreboard for the play-in game and first-round matchups. Only UNLV and UCLA use abbreviations; all other names are unabbreviated except for the common abbreviation "A&M".

Opening round "play-in" game
Tuesday, March 13, 2007 at Dayton, Ohio: (Niagara becomes the 16 seed in the West Region)
Niagara 77, Florida A&M 69
Clif Brown lead the Purple Eagles with 32 points, 18 of them coming from his 6-for-11 performance from beyond the arc, a career high for 3-point FGs made. The A&M Rattlers fought back from an early 13-point deficit, and briefly led before the half, but Niagara took over in the second half, with Brown scoring 24 of his 32 after the break, to ride a comfortable lead into the 64-team bracket.

First round

Thursday, March 15, 2007
at Buffalo:
Midwest Regional:
(4) Maryland 82, (13) Davidson 70
Davidson came alive in the second half with a 9-0 run, but Maryland was able to overcome this and win in the end.
(5) Butler 57, (12) Old Dominion 46
Both teams played strong all game, yet Butler's 17-0 run allowed them to take over.  Butler's aggressive ability to get to the free throw line for 16 shot opportunities also played a large role in preventing an upset in one of the school's first appearances as a higher seed.
West Regional: 
(11) Virginia Commonwealth 79, (6) Duke 77
Despite being at a size disadvantage, Virginia Commonwealth's aggressive effort to secure possession and quick defense hassled Duke the entire game. Eric Maynor's 17-foot pull-up jumper just beyond the foul line with 1.8 seconds remaining allowed the Rams to pull off the first major upset of the 2007 tournament. It was the Blue Devils' first first-round NCAA tourney loss since 1996.
(3) Pittsburgh 79, (14) Wright State 58
Wright State star Deshaun Wood was limited on his shooting by the Pitt defense, and the Pitt Panthers went on a big run midway through the first half to open up an early 13-0 lead, and they never looked back.
at Winston-Salem:
East Regional:
(7) Boston College 84, (10) Texas Tech 75
The Tech loss was Bob Knight's second straight tournament loss (the previous loss coming in 2005 in the Sweet 16).
(2) Georgetown 80, (15) Belmont 55
Erasing an early 11-4 deficit, the Hoyas advanced behind 20 points from sophomore Jesse Sapp and 15 from junior forward Jeff Green.
East Regional:
(9) Michigan State 61, (8) Marquette 49
Calling it one of the toughest games he has ever coached, Tom Izzo led the Spartans to a solid win, in which Drew Neitzel scored his 1000th career point.  A defensive struggle all the way, Marquette failed to get on the scoreboard until ten minutes remained in the first half, and MSU's rebounding domination prevented second chances for a shorthanded Golden Eagles team missing its leading scorer, Jerel McNeal.
(1) North Carolina 86, (16) Eastern Kentucky 65
After clawing their way back from a 27-point deficit to get within four early in the second half, the Colonels were overpowered by the Tar Heels and Tyler Hansbrough, who ended with 21 points.
at Lexington:
South Regional:
(6) Louisville 78, (11) Stanford 58
Rick Pitino and the Cardinals picked up the win at his old stomping ground, Rupp Arena, home of the Kentucky Wildcats. Both David Padgett and Edgar Sosa scored 16 in the win over Stanford, which missed just over half its free-throw attempts in the loss.
(3) Texas A&M 68, (14) Penn 52
Joseph Jones tied the game with 11 minutes left, then gave the Aggies the lead for good, both times scoring on dunks. 
South Regional:
(1) Ohio State 78, (16) Central Connecticut State 57
The 16th-seeded Blue Devils did not have an answer for seven-footer Greg Oden and were overpowered both in the paint and from the three-point arc, where the Buckeyes shot 11-for-20. Jamar Butler led the way, making 5-of-6 attempts.
(9) Xavier 79, (8) Brigham Young 77
Xavier won on a last-second shot in a game that was closely contested throughout.
at Sacramento:
East Regional:
(3) Washington State 70, (14) Oral Roberts 54
(6) Vanderbilt 77, (11) George Washington 44
West Regional:
(2) UCLA 70, (15) Weber State 42
(7) Indiana 70, (10) Gonzaga 57

Friday, March 16, 2007
at Columbus:
South Regional:
(4) Virginia 84, (13) Albany 57
Albany was a popular upset pick, as they had threatened #1 Connecticut a year prior by taking a double-digit lead with nine minutes left. However, the Hoos' J.R. Reynolds scored 23 of his 28 points in the first half en route to a 20-point halftime lead and a first-round rout.
(5) Tennessee 121, (12) Long Beach State 86
Tennessee shot 43-for-73 from the field, had 25 assists, six turnovers, and 11 steals. Their point total also ties a school record.
West Regional:
(5) Virginia Tech 54, (12) Illinois 52
The Fighting Illini were unable to hold onto a ten-point lead with a little over four minutes left, as the Hokies scored the final twelve points of the game. Deron Washington hit two three-pointers late in the game to aid the comeback, and finished with fourteen points.
(4) Southern Illinois 61, (13) Holy Cross 51
The game was a defensive stalemate most of the time, with the teams' turnovers often nearing their point totals, but the Salukis' ability to put Holy Cross in foul trouble paid off in the end.
at Chicago:
Midwest Regional:
(7) UNLV 67, (10) Georgia Tech 63
The Rebels received their first tournament victory since they reached the Final Four in 1991 with Jerry Tarkanian. Current coach Lon Kruger is only the fifth coach to lead four different teams to the NCAA tournament (Kansas State, Florida, Illinois). 
(2) Wisconsin 76, (15) Texas A&M-Corpus Christi 63
After scoring the first ten points of the game, and then taking a 25-7 lead, the Islanders of Corpus Christi were eventually overtaken by the Badgers' offense, led by guard Kammron Taylor, who scored 24 points, all in the second half, tying the game with around ten minutes to play in the second half on back-to-back three-pointers. Taylor scored 14 straight points at one stretch. Senior Chris Daniels led the upset effort for Corpus Christi, ending with 20 points and four blocks.
West Regional:
(1) Kansas 107, (16) Niagara 67
Kansas broke a three-game tourney losing streak, after losing back-to-back first round games to Bucknell and Bradley, as well as a 2004 Elite Eight loss to Georgia Tech. The Jayhawks got their first 100-point game of the season, although no one scored more than Mario Chalmers' 19 points. Niagara, a hot three-point shooting team, hit only 2-of-19 from beyond the arc, both trifectas coming in the first ten minutes of the game.
(8) Kentucky 67, (9) Villanova 58
at New Orleans:
South Regional:
(2) Memphis 73, (15) North Texas 58
The North Texas Mean Green led at several points early in the game before Memphis went on a small run to end the first half and would not surrender the lead again.
(7) Nevada 77, (10) Creighton 71 (OT)
Nevada defeated Creighton in the first overtime game of the 2007 tournament. The Wolf Pack's leader and three-time WAC Player of the Year Nick Fazekas had one of his weaker performances on the season and fouled out with about one minute of play left in overtime, but a pair of successful drives to the basket secured Nevada the win.
Midwest Regional:
(9) Purdue 72, (8) Arizona 63
Second-year coach Matt Painter received his first tournament win with the help of senior forward Carl Landry's 21 points. Landry was 6-for-10 from the floor and 8-for-8 at the free throw line. Freshman Chris Kramer added 16 points as well in the first tournament win for the Boilermakers since 2003.  This was also the last game coached by Arizona's long-time head coach, Lute Olson.
(1) Florida 112, (16) Jackson State 69
The Tigers of Jackson State had a lead early on, but the defending national champion Gators pulled away soon after, behind 21 points from Corey Brewer. Six Florida players had double-digit point totals in the blowout, and Florida's 71 second half points was a tournament record.
at Spokane:
Midwest Regional:
(11) Winthrop 74, (6) Notre Dame 64
After Winthrop started the second half with a 22-6 run to lead, 54-34, with less than 12 minutes remaining, Notre Dame made its own run to reclaim the lead at 63-62. However, Winthrop made several key baskets late in the game, outscoring Notre Dame 12-1 to seal their victory. This was the Eagles' first win in seven attempts, as previous tournament berths for Winthrop in 1999, 2000, 2001, 2002, 2005, and 2006 all resulted in first-round losses. 
(3) Oregon 58, (14) Miami (Ohio) 56
While both teams struggled to make shots, Oregon won the game at the free-throw line, where the Ducks converted on 15 of 17 opportunities. Senior guard Aaron Brooks scored 18 in the win.
East Regional:
(4) Texas 79, (13) New Mexico State 67
Reggie Theus' feisty New Mexico State team came up short against the Longhorns after claiming the lead briefly with just over seven minutes to play. Texas shot 25-of-26 from the free-throw line and made 49 percent of their field goals in the win. Freshman Kevin Durant led the team with 27 points, while senior Elijah Ingram had 16 for the Aggies in the loss.
(5) Southern California 77, (12) Arkansas 60 
Tim Floyd's Trojans convincingly defeated the Razorbacks.  Before the game, the Trojans listened to a talk by the mother of fallen teammate Ryan Francis. Francis, a starting point guard on the Trojans, had been murdered before the season began. His 20th birthday would have been March 17 and his mother flew in to watch the team her son would have played for in the tournament. The Trojans were not expected to make the NCAA tournament until 2008, once highly touted O. J. Mayo joined the squad.

Second round

Saturday, March 17, 2007
at Lexington:
South Regionals: (1) Ohio State 78, (9) Xavier 71 (OT)
Ron Lewis' long three-pointer with 2.0 seconds left forced overtime, and then Mike Conley, Jr. scored 11 of his 21 points in overtime.
South Regionals: (3) Texas A&M 72, (6) Louisville 69
The Aggies' backcourt tandem of Acie Law IV (26 points, including two free throws giving A&M a one-point lead with 57.6 seconds left) and Dominique Kirk (21 points) led the way, and Louisville freshman Edgar Sosa (31 points), after previously being 15-for-15 on free throws during his 30-point day, missed two free throws with Louisville down one, 70-69. Joseph Jones' two missed free throws with 29 seconds left gave Louisville a chance for the win before Sosa missed on a three-point attempt. The Aggies rebounded and Law hit two more free throws for the final score.
at Buffalo:
Midwest Regionals: (5) Butler 62, (4) Maryland 59
The Bulldogs squeaked out the win thanks to A.J. Graves' 19 points and a tenacious defense.
West Regionals: (3) Pittsburgh 84, (11) Virginia Commonwealth 79 (OT)
The Panthers withstood a Rams' comeback from 19 points down to force the extra session.
at Winston-Salem:
East Regionals: (2) Georgetown 62, (7) Boston College 55
In a renewal of their old Big East rivalry, Roy Hibbert scored 15 of his 17 points in the second half as "Hoya Paranoya" returned with a coach named Thompson (John Thompson III) and a player by the name of Ewing (Patrick Ewing Jr.) heading to the East Regional semifinals.
East Regionals: (1) North Carolina 81, (9) Michigan State 67
Tyler Hansbrough unmasked himself (from the facial injury suffered against Duke) and scored 33 points along with nine rebounds as the Heels pulled away from the Spartans late in the second half.
at Sacramento:
East Regionals: (6) Vanderbilt 78, (3) Washington State 74 (2 OT)
In what many considered the most exciting game of the day, the Commodores moved on thanks to Derrick Byars' 27 points.
West Regionals: (2) UCLA 54, (7) Indiana 49
In a low-scoring affair, the Bruins edged the Hoosiers, behind 15 points from Darren Collison, in a matchup of two programs with a combined 16 championships.

Sunday, March 18, 2007
at Columbus:
South Regionals: (5) Tennessee 77, (4) Virginia 74
A back-and-forth battle of guards Sean Singletary and Chris Lofton saw Lofton and the Volunteers get the win.  
West Regionals: (4) Southern Illinois 63, (5) Virginia Tech 48
The Salukis' star senior guard and MVC Player of the Year Jamaal Tatum scored 21 points in the win, going 6-for-9 from three-point range. However, the game was won with their strong defense, allowing the Hokies to score just 20 points in the first half, their fewest total in a half all season.
at New Orleans:
Midwest Regionals: (1) Florida 74, (9) Purdue 67
At the end of the first half it was still a close game, but in the second half Florida started to pull away and came out with the win.
South Regionals: (2) Memphis 78, (7) Nevada 62
Nevada's Nick Fazekas had a slow start on offense but finished the game with 20 points in what was his final NCAA game.  Memphis' quickness, defensive pressure, three-point shooting, and free-throw shooting were crucial to the Tigers' win. Chris Douglas-Roberts, Memphis' leading scorer, landed awkwardly on a put-back opportunity with about eight minutes left in the game and suffered an ankle sprain; he did not return.
at Chicago:
Midwest Regionals: (7) UNLV 74, (2) Wisconsin 68 
Seniors Wendell White (22 points) and Kevin Kruger (16 points) combined to score more than half of the Rebels' points, upsetting the Badgers and marking the biggest win for UNLV since their Final Four run in the early 1990s. 
West Regionals: (1) Kansas 88, (8) Kentucky 76
Julian Wright (21 points, 8 rebounds) and Brandon Rush (19 points, 6-for-7 on three-pointers) led the Jaywhawks past the Wildcats. Kansas has won the last three meetings with Kentucky but still trails in the all-time series, 19-6.
at Spokane:
Midwest Regionals: (3) Oregon 75,  (11) Winthrop 61
Brooks scored 22 points, going 8-for-15 from the field, to lead the Ducks to their first Sweet 16 since 2002 and their highest win total (28) in over sixty years, knocking off the final double-digit seed, the Eagles of Winthrop, despite 15 points and a career-high 12 rebounds by Torrell Martin.
East Regionals: (5) Southern California 87, (4) Texas 68
Freshman Daniel Hackett scored 20 points to lead Southern California past Texas. Although the Men of Troy were only leading by four towards the beginning of the second half, they were able to dominate offensively and defensively, holding a double-digit lead most of the half. Texas stars Kevin Durant (in what would be his last college game) and A.J. Abrams combined for 50 points in the losing effort for the Longhorns.

Regional semifinals (Sweet Sixteen)
Thursday, March 22, 2007
South Regionals at San Antonio:
(2) Memphis 65, (3) Texas A&M 64
After a solid performance by Aggie senior Acie Law IV, he failed to convert on an open layup with less than a minute to play, leaving Jeremy Hunt (19 points) and Chris Douglas-Roberts (15 points) with a trip to the Elite Eight.
(1) Ohio State 85, (5) Tennessee 84
The Buckeyes erased a 20-point deficit in the second half to win. Greg Oden blocked a shot with 0.2 seconds left to secure Ohio State's bid to the Elite Eight.
West Regionals at San José:
(1) Kansas 61, (4) Southern Illinois 58
After a slow start by senior Jamaal Tatum (19 points), a late shooting streak fell short, as did the Salukis' upset bid as the Jayhawks pulled it out, despite having only one scorer in double figures (Brandon Rush, 12 points). In the end, Kansas had nine players with at least one basket; Southern Illinois had only six.
(2) UCLA 64, (3) Pittsburgh 55
The main storyline was UCLA Coach Ben Howland's matchup against his former team, now coached by his former assistant coach, Jamie Dixon. Behind a smothering defense that continued to force its opponents to rush numerous close-range shots, UCLA held star Pitt center Aaron Gray, recruited by Howland, to 10 points and advanced to the Regional final.

Friday, March 23, 2007
East Regionals at East Rutherford:
(2) Georgetown 66, (6) Vanderbilt 65
With 2.5 seconds remaining, Jeff Green hit  the eventual game-winning shot while double-teamed, sending the Hoyas through to the Elite Eight. The play was controversial because many claim that Green's foot motions constituted traveling.
(1) North Carolina 74, (5) Southern California 64
The Tar Heels trailed by 16 points at one time, but an 18-0 second-half run secured the lead and eventually put away the Trojans.
Midwest Regionals at St. Louis:
(1) Florida 65, (5) Butler 57
(3) Oregon 76, (7) UNLV 72

Other facts
Florida A&M became the first team to play in the opening round play-in game more than once. It defeated Lehigh in the 2004 game, then lost to Kentucky in the first round.

References

Opening